The Ruwanweli Maha Seya, also known as the Mahathupa, is a stupa (a hemispherical structure containing relics) in Anuradhapura, Sri Lanka. Two quarts or one Dona of the Buddha's relics are enshrined in the stupa, making it the largest collection of his relics anywhere. It was built by Sinhalese King Dutugemunu in  140 B.C., who became king of Sri Lanka after a war in which the Chola King Elāra (Ellalan) was defeated. It is also known as Swarnamali Seya, Svaṇṇamāli Mahaceti (in Pali) and Rathnamali Seya.

This is one of the "Solosmasthana" (the 16 places of veneration) and the "Atamasthana" (the 8 places of veneration).
The Kaunghmudaw Pagoda in Sagaing, Myanmar is modelled after this stupa The Mahavamsa contains a detailed account on the construction and the opening ceremony of the stupa.

The stupa was covered by wilderness as of the 19th century. After fund raising efforts by a bhikkhu, it was renovated in the early 20th century. The Ruwanweli Seya Restoration Society was set up, most notably the philanthropist Hendrick Appuhamy, donated Rs 20 million (1912 ) adjusted for inflation in 2021 it is worth 611 million US Dollars for the restoration works, the foundation was founded in 1902 and the modern day crowning (a "crown" is a large gem placed at the very top of the stupa) was done on June 17, 1940, and the final crowning of the stupa took place on November 26, 2019.

Buddha’s Relic 

In the Mahavamsa, Ashoka of the Maurya dynasty chooses not to retrieve Buddha relics in the possession of Nagas at Ramagrama. It was said that on his deathbed, Buddha told a prophecy that of the eight donas of his body relics, one would be venerated by the Koliyas of Ramagrama, then the relics would belong to the Nagas until being enshrined in Sri Lanka. Ashoka is told more prophecy by arhats, who speak of the future enshrinement of these relics by king Dutthagamani.

King Dutthagamini then received from the Sangha the Buddha’s relics upon his head in a casket and departed from the golden pavilion in the midst of manifold offerings and honours made by gods and ‘‘Brahmas’’. He circumambulated the relic-chamber three times, entered to it from the east, and when laid the relic-casket on a silver couch one ‘‘koṭi’’ worth, that was arranged in the north side. An image of the Buddha was then, according to the Buddha’s determination,
created in the lion’s reclining posture (‘‘sīhaseyya’’), and all the relics were enshrined within that image. When the enshrining of the relics in the Great Stūpa Ruvanveli was completed, the two novices Uttara and Sumana closed the relic-chamber with the stone-blocks that were previously hidden to be used as a lid.

In the Thupavamsa numerous types of beings attended the enshrinement of the relics into the Mahathupa; including the Naga king Mahakala who until recently guarded them. The relics were to be placed atop a golden throne crafted by Visvakarman the divine artificer; the throne brought by Indra. Brahma offers his invisible umbrella of sovereignty, with the king Dutthagamani offering his own. The arhat Indagutta creates a metal canopy over the universe, so that Mara will not interfere, as monks chanted the Sutta Pitaka (the Collection of Discourses delivered by the Buddha). Dutthagamani ceremoniously enters with the urn atop his head; but as he is about to place the urn on the golden throne, the relics rise into the air and form Buddha, with each of the 32 major signs and 80 lesser signs of a great man. In this form he performs the twin miracle of fire and water, fulfilling the fifth of his death bed resolutions. One hundred and twenty million gods and humans gain arhatship from this experience. The relics return to the urn and they are laid to rest and the chamber sealed with forty meter stone slabs.

‘‘"The relic-chamber shall not shake even by an earthquake; flowers such as jasmine that were offered on that day shall not wither till the end of Buddha Gotama’s Dispensation; the lamps that were kindled with ghee-oil shall not be extinguished; the clay that was mixed with perfume and sandalwood shall not dry; even a single scratch shall not appear within the relic-chamber; stains shall not appear in any of the golden goods that were offered.’ All this occurred by the determination-power of all Arahants present. They determined also that inimical persons should
not be able to even see the relic-chamber. Furthermore, by order of king Dutugemunu, the people of Srī Lanka enshrined, along with many other objects such as golden and silver caskets, thousand more of the Buddha's relics over the relic-chamber."

History
King Dutugemunu started the construction of the stupa, however he died from an illness before it was finished. The construction began only after he conquered Rajarata from the Chola general Elāra.

The stupa was damaged by during the Chola conquest of Anuradhapura, but was renovated during the reign of Parakramabahu I (1153–1187), who invaded South India, capturing large parts of Tamil Nadu. Parakramabahu used the captured Tamils for the work of renovation.

Images

See also 
Ancient stupas of Sri Lanka
List of tallest structures built before the 20th century
Ancient Constructions of Sri Lanka
Architecture of ancient Sri Lanka
Architecture of Sri Lanka
Jetavanaramaya
Atamasthana
Mahawansa
Solosmasthana

References 

 ‘‘This page incorporates content from Dr. Rohan Hettiarachchi’s  used with permission of website owner.’’

Bibliography 
Shereen Amendra, "Beyond the Seeing Eye: The Mahathupa of Lanka: An Insight", Shereen Amendra, 2006, 
Ulrich von Schroeder, "Buddhist Sculptures of Sri Lanka", Visual Dharma Publications, 1990, 
 

Buddhist temples in Anuradhapura
Stupas in Anuradhapura
Archaeological protected monuments in Anuradhapura District
Buildings and structures completed in the reign of Dutugamunu